Pop-Up Magazine is a magazine performed live. The live shows focus on breaking multimedia stories that are performed on stage by writers, radio producers, photographers, filmmakers, and musicians. The events are not live-streamed or recorded for later viewing.

Pop-Up Magazine events are currently produced two to three times a year and routinely sell out. There usually contain an average of 12 short stories, with production running approximately 100 minutes.

Each story is designed specifically for a live format, often using media considered unconventional for journalism. Stories are performed alongside photographs, animations, illustrations or film, and many are accompanied by an original score performed live by Magik*Magik Orchestra.

History 
Pop-Up Magazine was founded in San Francisco in 2009 by Douglas McGray, Lauren Smith, Derek Fagerstrom, Evan Ratliff, and Maili Holiman.

McGray says the idea for the show came from trying to get different kinds of storytellers and artists together in the same room. "Filmmakers have their film openings, artists will have gallery openings, and writers will have their readings. And we're never at the same things together. We thought about the idea of a live magazine as a way to bring these different communities together and bring their communities of fans together."

The first Pop-Up Magazine show took place in 2009 at the 360-seat Brava Theater in San Francisco's Mission District. In 2010 Pop-Up Magazine grew to a 900-seat auditorium, and the audience reached 2,600in 2011. 

Pop-Up Magazine went on its first national tour in 2015, with stops in San Francisco, Los Angeles, Portland, Seattle, Chicago, and New York City. The show toured again in the spring of 2016, before a live audience of 10,000 people, in New York City, Los Angeles, San Francisco, and Oakland.

Collaborations 
Outside of its own tours, Pop-Up Magazine occasionally partners with organizations and public figures for special performances. In 2011, they collaborated with SFMOMA for a show about wine and ESPN the Magazine for a show about sports. In 2013, they produced a night of stories and live music inspired by Beck's Song Reader, a collection of sheet music written by Beck and published by McSweeneys. In 2015 they curated Session 8 of TED2015 in Vancouver, producing a set of 11 stories performed on TED's main stage.

The California Sunday Magazine 

Pop-Up Magazine is produced by California Sunday, Inc., which published an online and print magazine called The California Sunday Magazine, from 2014 to 2020. McGray launched the magazine with publisher Chas Edwards in October 2014. McGray said: "We started a media company. We approached it like a story production company. Some of the things we'd make would be live experiences, live stories, and some of the things we'd make would be stories for you to read at home."

In 2016, the magazine won a National Magazine Award for overall excellence in print magazine photography. Other finalists included National Geographic, New York, Vanity Fair, and The Wall Street Journal.

Past contributors 

 Larry Sultan, photographer 
 Daniel Alarcón, novelist, journalist, and co-creator, Radio Ambulante
 Susan Orlean, writer for The New Yorker
 Beck, musician 
 Alice Walker, novelist
 Jeff Bridges, actor 
 Michael Pollan, author 
 Marc Bamuthi Joseph, poet, playwright, dancer
 Alexis Madrigal, editor in chief, Fusion
 John C. Reilly, actor
 Autumn de Wilde, photographer
 Kumail Nanjiani, comedian and actor, Silicon Valley 
 Starlee Kine, creator and host, Mystery Show
 Lee Unkrich, Oscar-winning filmmaker, Toy Story 3 
 Tracy Clayton and Heben Nigatu, co-hosts, BuzzFeed's Another Round
 Alex Gibney, Oscar-winning filmmaker
 Stephanie Foo, producer, This American Life 
 Jon Mooallem, journalist and author
 Jenna Wortham, staff writer, The New York Times Magazine
 Sam Green, Oscar-nominated filmmaker and live cinema performer
 Christopher Hawthorne, architecture critic for the LA Times
 Jad Abumrad, founder and host, Radiolab
 Katy Grannan, photographer
 Ava DuVernay, Oscar-nominated director, Selma
 The Kitchen Sisters, radio producers
 Steven Okazaki, Oscar-winning filmmaker
 Rebecca Solnit, author
 Jon Ronson, author and radio personality
 Sasheer Zamata, cast member, Saturday Night Live
 Alec Soth, photographer
 Samin Nosrat, chef and writer.

References

External links
 Pop-Up Magazine YouTube

Theatre in San Francisco
Recurring events established in 2009